Quercus daimingshanensis is a rare Asian species of trees in the beech family. It has been found only  in a small region of southern China, in the Daming Shan region of the Province of Guangxi. It is placed in subgenus Cerris, section Cyclobalanopsis.

Quercus daimingshanensis is a tree up to 15 meters tall with hairless twigs and leaves as much as 7 cm long.

References

External links
line drawing, Flora of China Illustrations vol. 4, figure 375, drawing 9 at lower right

daimingshanensis
Flora of Guangxi
Plants described in 1979